This is a list of the buildings, sites, districts, and objects listed on the National Register of Historic Places in the Republic of Palau. There are currently six listed sites located in only four of the sixteen states of Palau.

Listings 

|}

See also
List of United States National Historic Landmarks in United States commonwealths and territories, associated states, and foreign states

References

External links

National Park Service, National Register of Historic Places Program